Edwin Clay Timanus (1863–1923) was an American politician who served as mayor of Baltimore from 1904 to 1907. He assumed the office after the suicide of his predecessor Robert McLane. He was succeeded by Democrat J. Barry Mahool. Born in Baltimore to John T. and Fannie (Carroll) Timanus, his brother Gutavus served as mayor of Laurel, Maryland. His family owned a watermill. He was also a member of the Maryland racing commission and active in Republican politics. He died in his home town on November 16, 1923.

References

Mayors of Baltimore
1863 births
1923 deaths
Maryland Republicans